The 2001 Grand Valley State Lakers football team that represented the Grand Valley State University in the Great Lakes Intercollegiate Athletic Conference (GLIAC) during the 2001 NCAA Division II football season. In their 11th season under head coach Brian Kelly, the Lakers compiled a 13–1 record (9–0 against conference opponents), outscored opponents by a total of 707 to 231, and won the GLIAC championship. The team qualified for the playoffs and advanced to the national championship game where they lost to North Dakota.

The team played its home games at Lubbers Stadium in Allendale Charter Township, Michigan.

Schedule

References

Grand Valley State
Grand Valley State Lakers football seasons
Great Lakes Intercollegiate Athletic Conference football champion seasons
Grand Valley State Lakers football